Bohuslav Fuchs (24 March 1895 in Všechovice – 18 September 1972 in Brno) was a Czech modernist architect.

Life and career
A mason by education, Fuchs studied with Jan Kotěra at the Academy of Fine Arts in Prague between 1916 and 1919, and then later worked in Kotěra's atelier for two years.  After 1922, Fuchs resided in Brno, where he first worked at the city construction office and then later (from 1929) in his own atelier.  Between 1947 and 1958, Fuchs was a professor of architecture at Brno University of Technology. He participated in several professional associations abroad (e. g. British RIBA). His projects, realized mainly in Brno, were predominantly influenced by functionalism.

Major works in Brno

 Zemanova kavárna (Café Zeman), 1925
 Masná burza (Meat Exchange House), 1926
 Hotel Avion, 1927 -a small museum of his works open in the main reception area.
 Pavillons at the Brno Exhibition Ground, 1928
 Moravská banka, 1930, in cooperation with Arnošt Wiesner
 Vesna Professional Secondary School for Woman's Occupation, 1930, in cooperation with Josef Polášek
 Bathhouse in Zábrdovice, 1930
 Petrák Villa, 1936
 Post office, 1938
 Bus station in Benešova Street), 1949
 Various family houses

References
 Information on archiweb.cz

Further reading
 Emilia Terragni, Helen Thomas (2012): 20th-century world architecture - Bohuslav Fuchs: Avion p. 499, Zábrdovice p. 461, Trenčianske Teplice p. 509. Phaidon.

Sources
http://www.bam.brno.cz/en/architect/2-bohuslav-fuchs

1895 births
1972 deaths
People from Přerov District
People from the Margraviate of Moravia
Czech architects
Functionalist architects
Academy of Fine Arts, Prague alumni
Herder Prize recipients